Note — many sporting events did not take place because of World War II. The 1944 Summer Olympics was also cancelled due to WWII. It was going to be held in London, United Kingdom. For more visit 1944 Summer Olympics.1944 in sports describes the year's events in world sport.

American football
 NFL Championship: the Green Bay Packers won 14–7 over the New York Giants at the Polo Grounds
 Army Cadets – college football national championship

Association football
La Liga won by Valencia CF
German football championship won by Dresdner SC
Serie A – not held due to the conquest of Italy.
Primeira Liga won by Sporting CP
There is no major football competition in England, Scotland or France due to World War II. In England, several regional leagues are played but statistics from these are not counted in players’ figures.

Australian rules football
 Victorian Football League
 July 29: North Melbourne 11.21 (87) pip Richmond 14.2 (86) in the only VFL/AFL match where the winning team scored three fewer goals than the loser.
 September 30: Fitzroy wins the 48th VFL Premiership defeating Richmond 9.12 (66) to 7.9 (51) in the Grand Final.

Baseball
 May 7 – Chucho Ramos made his major league debut as first baseman and outfielder with the Cincinnati Reds. He was the third baseball player from Venezuela to play Major League Baseball.
 June 10 – 15-year-old Joe Nuxhall becomes the youngest baseball player to pitch a game in major league history. 
 World Series – St. Louis Cardinals defeats St. Louis Browns, 4 games to 2.
 Negro World Series – Homestead Grays defeat Birmingham Black Barons, 4 games to 1.
 Hall of Fame election – Commissioner Kenesaw Mountain Landis is elected by the Hall of Fame Committee in December following his death the previous month. The long-delayed selection of at least 10 players from the 19th century is promised the following year.

Basketball
NBL Championship
Fort Wayne Zollner Pistons win three games to none over the Sheboygan Redskins

Lithuania
BC Žalgiris was founded in Kaunas (former part of Soviet Union).

Boxing
August 4 – the "War Bonds Fight".  $36m is raised to fund the war effort as Beau Jack wins a ten-round decision over arch-rival Bob Montgomery at New York City's Madison Square Garden. A few weeks later, they were both drafted on the same day by the U.S. Army.

Cricket
Events
 There is no first-class cricket in England, Australia or South Africa due to World War II. A few first-class matches are played in the West Indies and New Zealand but are not part of any official competition.
India
 Ranji Trophy – Western India beat Bengal by an innings and 23 runs.
 Bombay Pentangular – Muslims

Cycling
Tour de France
 Not contested due to World War II
Giro d'Italia
 Not contested due to World War II

Figure skating
World Figure Skating Championships
 Not contested due to World War II

Golf
Men's professional
 Masters Tournament – not played due to World War II
 U.S. Open – not played due to World War II
 British Open – not played due to World War II
 PGA Championship – Bob Hamilton
Men's amateur
 British Amateur – not played due to World War II
 U.S. Amateur – not played due to World War II
Women's professional
 Women's Western Open – Babe Zaharias
 Titleholders Championship – not played due to World War II

Horse racing
Steeplechases
 Cheltenham Gold Cup – not held due to World War II Grand National – not held due to World War IIHurdle races
 Champion Hurdle – not held due to World War IIFlat races
 Australia – Melbourne Cup won by Sirius
 Canada – King's Plate won by Acara
 France – Prix de l'Arc de Triomphe won by Ardan
 Ireland – Irish Derby Stakes won by Slide On
 English Triple Crown Races:
 2,000 Guineas Stakes – Garden Path
 The Derby – Ocean Swell
 St. Leger Stakes – Tehran
 United States Triple Crown Races:
 Kentucky Derby – Pensive
 Preakness Stakes – Pensive
 Belmont Stakes – Bounding Home

Ice hockey
 Stanley Cup – Montreal Canadiens sweep the Chicago Black Hawks in four straight games.

Motor racing
Events
 No major races are held anywhere worldwide due to World War II

Olympic Games
1944 Winter Olympics
 The 1944 Winter Olympics, due to take place at Cortina d'Ampezzo, are cancelled due to World War II
 
1944 Summer Olympics
 The 1944 Summer Olympics, due to take place at London, are cancelled due to World War II 

Rowing
The Boat Race
 Oxford and Cambridge Boat Race is not contested due to World War II

Rugby league
1944 New Zealand rugby league season
1944 NSWRFL season
1943–44 Northern Rugby Football League Wartime Emergency League season / 1944–45 Northern Rugby Football League Wartime Emergency League season

Rugby union
 Five Nations Championship series is not contested due to World War II

Speed skating
Speed Skating World Championships
 Not contested due to World War II

Tennis
Australia
 Australian Men's Singles Championship – not contested Australian Women's Singles Championship – not contestedEngland
 Wimbledon Men's Singles Championship – not contested Wimbledon Women's Singles Championship – not contestedFrance
 French Men's Singles Championship – Yvon Petra (France) defeats Henri Cochet (France) — score to be ascertained French Women's Singles Championship – Raymonde Veber (France) † details to be ascertainedUSA
 American Men's Singles Championship – Frank Parker (USA) defeats Bill Talbert (USA) 6–4, 3–6, 6–3, 6–3
 American Women's Singles Championship – Pauline Betz Addie (USA) defeats Margaret Osborne duPont (USA) 6–3, 8–6
Davis Cup
 1944 International Lawn Tennis Challenge – not contested''

Awards
 Associated Press Male Athlete of the Year: Byron Nelson, PGA golf
 Associated Press Female Athlete of the Year: Ann Curtis, Swimming

Notes
 Ettore Rossi did organise a "Campionato Alta Italia" for teams from northern Italy, whilst in southern Italy only regional competitions followed by playoffs were held.

 Owing to government bans on weekday sport, the Melbourne Cup was run on a Saturday from 1942 to 1944.

 The 1944 Prix de l'Arc de Triomphe  was run at Le Tremblay over 2,300 metres.

References

 
Sports by year